Accompanying Hurricane Katrina's catastrophic coastal impacts was a moderate tornado outbreak spawned by the cyclone's outer bands. The event spanned August 26–31, 2005, with 57 tornadoes touching down across 8 states. One person died and numerous communities suffered damage of varying degrees from central Mississippi to Pennsylvania, with Georgia sustaining record monetary damage for the month of August. Due to extreme devastation in coastal areas of Louisiana and Mississippi, multiple tornadoes may have been overlooked—overshadowed by the effects of storm surge and large-scale wind—and thus the full extent of the hurricane's tornado outbreak is uncertain. Furthermore, an indeterminate number of waterspouts likely formed throughout the life cycle of  Hurricane Katrina.

The outbreak began with an isolated F2 over the Florida Keys on August 26; no tornadoes were recorded the following day as the storm traversed the Gulf of Mexico. Four weak tornadoes were observed on August 28 as the hurricane approached land, each causing little damage. Coincident with Katrina's landfall, activity began in earnest on August 29 with numerous tornadoes touching down across Gulf Coast states. Georgia suffered the greatest impact on this day, with multiple F1 and F2 tornadoes causing significant damage; one person died in Carroll County, marking the first known instance of a tornado-related death in the state during August. A record 18 tornadoes touched down across Georgia on August 29, far exceeding the previous daily record of just 2 tornadoes for the month throughout the state. Activity diminished over the subsequent two days as the former hurricane moved northward. Several more tornadoes touched down across the Mid-Atlantic states before the cessation of the outbreak just after midnight local time on August 31.

Background
Hurricane Katrina began as a tropical depression on August 23 near the Bahamas. Moving northwest, the intensifying system was named Katrina the next day; it proceeded to make landfall on the southern tip of Florida as a minimal hurricane, causing extensive damage. In crossing Florida, the hurricane weakened to a tropical storm; however, the warm waters of the Gulf of Mexico allowed it to rapidly intensify to the seventh-strongest Atlantic hurricane on record. Afterward, Katrina made landfall as a Category 3 near Buras-Triumph, Louisiana on August 29, and once more near the Mississippi–Louisiana border. Katrina progressed northward through the Central United States and finally dissipated on August 31 near the Great Lakes, when it was absorbed by a cold front. Throughout its path, Katrina was responsible for $125 billion in damage and 1,245–1,836 fatalities. These ranked it as the costliest natural disaster in United States' history and the deadliest since a hurricane in 1928.

Small-scale, transient supercells embedded within the outer bands of the hurricane produced numerous tornadoes throughout its path. Unlike supercells over the Great Plains, these storms last no more than a few hours and are often training. Most of the tornadoes occurred in the hurricane's right-front quadrant, where strong low-level wind shear, high moisture content, and low convective available potential energy combined to produce locally favorable tornadic conditions. A study in 2008 conducted through the American Geophysical Union found that the majority of Katrina-related supercells developed inland over the Gulf Coast rather than offshore, a finding contrary to multiple studies of prior tropical cyclones.

Daily statistics

List of tornadoes

See also 

 Hurricane Katrina effects by region
 List of North American tornadoes and tornado outbreaks
 List of tornadoes spawned by tropical cyclones
 Meteorological history of Hurricane Katrina

Notes

References

External links

 
 Storm Storm summary by NWS Jackson, Mississippi
 Tornado outbreak summary for Georgia by NWS Peachtree City, Georgia

Tornado
F2 tornadoes
Tornadoes of 2005
Tornadoes in Alabama
Tornadoes in Florida
Tornadoes in Georgia (U.S. state)
Tornadoes in Mississippi
Tornadoes in North Carolina
Tornadoes in Ohio
Tornadoes in Pennsylvania
Tornadoes in Virginia
August 2005 events in the United States
Katrina tornado outbreak